Over the Top is an American sitcom starring Tim Curry, Annie Potts, and Steve Carell. The series premiered on ABC on October 21, 1997. Although 11 episodes (plus a pilot) were produced, the series was canceled after only three had aired.

Synopsis
After being fired from the soap opera Days to Remember, down on his luck, eccentric, self-centered actor Simon Ferguson (Tim Curry) moves into Manhattan's Metropolitan Hotel, which is run by ex-wife Hadley Martin (Annie Potts), whom he was married to 20 years prior... for twelve days.  Despite her initial exasperation with her ex, Hadley again succumbs to the "Ferguson charm", as do all of those around her.

Simon reluctantly plays role model to Hadley's children from a different marriage: precocious -year-old Daniel (Luke Tarsitano) and angst-ridden teen Gwen (Marla Sokoloff).  The hotel's psychotic Greek chef, Yorgo Galfanikos (Steve Carell), also looks up to Simon, having been a fan of his soap opera and films.  Also seen are Rose (Liz Torres), the hotel's assistant manager, Robert McSwain (John O'Hurley), the hotel's main investor, Tommy Sutton (Devin Neil Oatway), a popular jock Gwen fawns over, and Jesse (Danny Strong), a geek who is smitten with Gwen.

Episodes mostly centered around Simon's outlandish shenanigans and attempts to break back into show business.

Cast & Characters
Tim Curry as Simon FergusonThe star of his acting class, Simon was a British actor with a promising career ahead of him, even garnering an Academy Award nomination in 1977, but his ego got in the way. After gaining a reputation for being difficult to work with, he was forced to take roles in straight-to-video fare like "Hardbodies 3," and eventually the trashy TV soap opera "Days to Remember."  Simon's only real friend is Hadley, whom he was briefly married to decades earlier.
Annie Potts as Hadley MartinHailing from Tennessee, Hadley moved to New York to pursue an acting career, but following a string of rejection and failed marriages, she found herself playing a single-mom to a pair of kids while managing a hotel in Manhattan.
Steve Carell as Yorgo GalfanikosA Greek immigrant who's obsessed with presenting the perfect meal, chef Yorgo exudes a manic temperament that comes across as hostile even when he's being sincere.
Luke Tarsitano as Daniel MartinHadley's 7-year-old son questions everything and is a constant source of aggravation for both his sister and Simon.
Marla Sokoloff as Gwen MartinHadley's defiant teenage daughter, who's smitten with boys and social status.
Liz Torres as RoseThe hefty Assistant Manager of The Metropolitan Hotel, the Hispanic Rose takes no guff from anyone and is quick to spout off her opinion on any subject.
John O'Hurley as Robert McSwainThe infrequently-seen hotel investor is conservative to the point of being repressed, and his crush on Hadley is transparent.

Production
The show was pitched in early 1996 to ABC president Ted Harbert, and although it would not be ready to hit the air for the 1996-1997 season, it remained in development.  Tim Curry was aboard and wanted the relationship between the two leads to be loosely based on his relationship with friend and next door neighbor Annie Potts, to whom he said, "I wish you could do this with me!"  Potts was starring in the TV spin-off of the popular film Dangerous Minds at the time, so it did not seem as though a reunion was imminent (the two had previously co-starred together as husband and wife in the film Pass the Ammo).  Three days before they were ready to shoot the pilot for Over the Top, Dangerous Minds was canceled, and although Potts was heartbroken over the cancellation of that series, she jumped at the chance to work with Curry again.

The premise of the pilot was that Curry's character, actor Simon Ferguson, was fired from his soap opera, so he visited the quaint bed and breakfast in Upstate New York owned by his ex-wife, Kate (Potts), whom he was once married to for six months.  Although flabbergasted with Simon, Kate ultimately decided to let her ex stay on as a new addition to the staff.  The cast was rounded out by Luke Tarsitano and Natanya Ross as Kate's children from a subsequent marriage, Debra Jo Rupp as the maid, and a then-unknown actor named Steve Carell as manic chef Yorgo.

By the time the pilot was filmed, ABC Entertainment president Ted Harbert had been replaced by Jamie Tarses, whom executive producer Robert Morton was dating.  Rumors began to swirl that the series was only picked up as a result of their romance, and it did not help matters that the press was only shown snippets of the pilot episode.  In the months between the time the series was picked up and its scheduled premiere, Morton and Tarses' relationship ended.

Originally slated to debut on September 23, 1997 the show's premiere was delayed until October 21, opposite the World Series, so it could be retooled.  Natanya Ross and Debra Jo Rupp were replaced by Marla Sokoloff and Liz Torres, and John O'Hurley's character was written into the show on a recurring basis. Kate was renamed Hadley and her character became more sympathetic toward Simon. The setting was changed to New York City and the pilot was reshot (as the episode "I'm Bonnie, I'm Clyde").  The reason given for the retooling was because in NYC there would be more opportunities "for comedic interaction with city characters", but the press began to speculate that the changes were again a result of the failed Tarses/Morton romance.  Morton sidestepped this question by claiming, "We needed to give Tim a bigger playing field," and that the cast "was not as comfortable with each other as we wanted".  ABC, meanwhile, claimed that they did not want their 8:00 p.m. lead-in show, Soul Man, to face off against what was expected to be a high-rated season premiere of Mad About You, so they rearranged the schedule.  "By shifting Soul Man'''s time slot for the first few weeks of the season," Tarses released in a public statement, "we're giving this pivotal series the luxury to recapture its audience without intense premiere competition."

The show's stars, however, remained optimistic.  Curry went on a promotional tour, appearing on talk shows such as The View, Vibe,  Live with Regis and Kathie Lee, and Arthel & Fred, though interviewers seemed to focus less on Over the Top and more on The Rocky Horror Picture Show.  Potts, meanwhile, also did some interviews, barely acknowledging the behind the scenes problems and claiming that the show should speak for itself.Over the Top received minuscule network promotion (generally only small blurbs tacked onto the ends of commercials for Soul Man) and aired for three weeks with dismal ratings before being canceled (in some markets the final November 4 episode was bumped off the schedule unannounced for election coverage, and some TV Guide listings were a little slow to catch up, citing the unaired episodes "Who's Afraid of Simon Ferguson?" and "The Review" in the weeks following the show's cancellation).  Production was instantly halted two episodes shy of the standard 13-episode order for a new series, and almost immediately following the show's cancellation, executive producers Mitchel Katlin and Nat Bernstein cried foul, blaming the Morton/Tarses breakup for the demise of the show.

Episodes
Pilot

Season 1 (1997)

Reception
The show was almost universally critically panned.  Matt Roush wrote in his USA Today review that Curry "gives it his maul", and that the show's leads seemed "lost in the TV equivalent of summer stock". Ken Tucker of Entertainment Weekly went one step further, likening it to a variation of The Odd Couple that possessed "neither romantic spark nor crisp verbal byplay".  The Los Angeles Daily News claimed it was the worst new show of the season, and that if you tuned in to the show at 8:30, you would "probably be watching something else by 8:38". TeeVee's Peter Ko wrote a lengthy review (which itself got some publicity nine years later) in which he heavily bashed Curry, then he went on to state, "I have stood in a freezer full of dead people at the morgue. I have seen a man's scalp pulled back over his nose. I've even seen 35 minutes of Ellen DeGeneres's Mr. Wrong. But I can now honestly say that until Steve Carell's turn in the premiere of Over the Top, I have never known true horror."  The Washington Post's Tom Shales, on the other hand, was substantially kinder than most critics, saying "the show seemed merely okay at first encounter," but after seeing the season's other new shows, "Over the Top is looking better and better.  I could almost kiss it right on the lips."Over the Top'' debuted opposite the World Series with minuscule promotion to lowest ratings ABC had ever had for a non-rerun-filled Tuesday night, so it was canceled after only three episodes had aired.

Although the complete series barely aired anywhere in the world, all 12 episodes of the show that were filmed (including the original version of the pilot) were subsequently leaked and have been circulating among Curry's fans.  Initial copies that surfaced featured Finnish subtitles; dupes of VHS press screeners later began to make the rounds.

The series gained additional interest after Steve Carell became famous and mentioned it several times in interviews, particularly after reading an excerpt of Peter Ko's review during a 2006 Television Critics Association speech.

References

External links
 

1990s American sitcoms
1997 American television series debuts
1997 American television series endings
American Broadcasting Company original programming
English-language television shows
Television series by Sony Pictures Television
Television shows set in New York City